Auristomia rutor is a species of sea snail, a marine gastropod mollusk in the family Pyramidellidae, the pyrams, and their allies.

Description
The length of the shell measures 2.5 mm.

Distribution
This species occurs in the following locations:
 European waters (ERMS scope)
 Portuguese Exclusive Economic Zone
 Spanish Exclusive Economic Zone
 off Algeria and Morocco.

References

 Nofroni I. & Tringali L.P. (1996). Random notes on Eastern Atlantic, Mediterranean and Lessepsian Pyramidellidae (Gastropoda: Heterobranchia: Pyramidelloidea). Notiziario del C.I.S.MA. 17: 21-49

External links
 To CLEMAM
 To Encyclopedia of Life
 To World Register of Marine Species
 

Pyramidellidae
Gastropods described in 1994